The Castellani were a family of goldsmiths, collectors, antique dealers and potters who created a business "empire" active in Rome during the 18th and 19th centuries.

History 
Fortunato Pio Castellani (1794–1865) is regarded as the forefather of the family. In 1814, Fortunato opened his own workshop in Rome. The progenitor specialized in the creation of jewels imitating the ones that then came to light from the necropolis of Etruria, that were found in the excavations of Pompeii and Herculaneum or that could be observed in the Campana collection. Initiating a partnership with Duke Michelangelo Caetani, a lover of fine arts and a designer of jewels himself, allowed Fortunato Castellani to quickly work for the most illustrious aristocratic families, initially Roman and at a later date even European. Fortunato also imported luxurious goldsmith works from the rest of Europe to be resold in Rome.

Fortunato had three sons. His sons Augusto and Alessandro worked with their father and continued their activities as goldsmiths and antiquarian; his third son, Guglielmo, instead devoted himself to the art of ceramics. Fortunato Pio retired in 1850. The Castellani of the second generation devoted themselves only to the trade of jewels of their own production or to the sale of archaeological finds. The creative part was entrusted to Alessandro Castellani and Michelangelo Caetani, while Augusto was mainly interested in the financial aspects of the company. In 1859, the Castellani devoted themselves for five months to the restoration and cataloguing of the Campana Collection; they thus had the opportunity to refine their observations on the technique of granulation and filigree and to finally achieve an acceptable reproduction of them.

During the second half of the 19th century, the Castellani goldsmiths had a leading role in the European market. Alessandro, who had fled to France for political reasons in 1860, opened with great success new locations in Paris and Naples in which antiquities, mainly of Etruscan origin, were traded. Clients included Napoleon III, the Louvre Museum and the British Museum, directed by Sir Isaac Newton. It has been hypothesized that some Etruscan finds traded by the Castellani were imitations. Recent chemical analyses on some antiquarian finds sold by the Castellani to the Berlin Museum have confirmed that Alessandro Castellani sometimes also sold false finds.

When Alessandro died in 1883, his brother Augusto transformed the shop into a private museum. The trading activity continued with the nephews Alfredo and Torquato, sons of Augusto and Alessandro respectively; the first was a goldsmith, the second a ceramist. Their deaths, which occurred in the 1930s, coincided with the end of the family's trading activity.

Family members 
 Fortunato Pio Castellani (1794–1865) - the progenitor, goldsmith, antiquarian
 Alessandro Castellani (1823–1883) - son of Fortunato, patriot in favour of Mazzini, goldsmith, antiquarian
 Augusto Castellani (1829–1914) - son of Fortunato, goldsmith, antiquarian, collector
 Guglielmo Castellani (1836–1896) - son of Fortunato, ceramist
 Torquato Castellani (1846–1931) - son of Alessandro, ceramist
 Olga Castellani (1879–1965) - daughter of Torquato, ceramist
 Pio Fabri (1847–1927) - son-in-law of Augustus, ceramist
 Alfredo Castellani (1856–1930) - son of Augustus, goldsmith and restorer

Castellani jewellery collection 
The Castellani have preserved and donated to the Italian State the jewels they created during their centenary activity that remained in their possession. These jewels are now exhibited in the National Museum of Villa Giulia. Augustus, who had donated a large collection of rare pieces to the Capitoline Museums and the Artistic-Industrial Museum of Rome, left his collection of Greek, Italiot and Etruscan vases, bronzes, ivories, jewels and coins to his son Alfredo on his death. Alfredo, the last male descendant of the Castellani, donated almost all of the collection to the Italian State with only two exceptions: a gospel blanket in gold, sapphires, pearls and ivory, and a votive crown in gold, pearls and rubies left, by testamentary will, to St. Peter's Basilica in the Vatican City, where they are exhibited at the Basilica's Treasure Museum.

Gallery

References

Bibliography 
 G. Bordenache Battaglia, «CASTELLANI». In: Dizionario Biografico degli Italiani, Roma: Istituto della Enciclopedia Italiana, 1978 (on-line).
 Ministero per i Beni e le Attività culturali, Soprintendenza per i Beni Archeologici del Lazio, I Castellani e l'oreficeria archeologica italiana : New York, the bard graduate center for studies in the decorative arts, 18 novembre 2004-6 febbraio 2005; Londra, Somerset house, 5 maggio-18 settembre 2005; Roma, Museo Nazionale Etrusco di Villa Giulia, 11 novembre 2005-26 febbraio 2006, Roma: "L'Erma" di Bretschneider, 2005. ISBN 88-8265-354-4 (Google books).
 Sante Guido, L'oreficeria sacra dei Castellani in Vaticano, Città del Vaticano: Edizioni Capitolo Vaticano, 2011 - (Archivium Sancti Petri). ISBN 9788863390223.
 Sante Guido,  Il Calice Castellani nel Museo della Basilica Papale di Santa Maria Maggiore , Roma: Lisanti Editore - (Studia Liberiana IV). ISBN 9788890583810.

External links 
 

Italian goldsmiths
Italian potters
Italian collectors
People from Rome
Italian families